Serkan Balcı (born 22 August 1983) is a former Turkish international footballer.

Club career
He has played for Fenerbahçe SK and Gençlerbirliği S.K. He signed for Trabzonspor in June 2007.

International career
He was member of Turkey national football team in 2003 FIFA Confederations Cup which finished in third place.

Honours
Gençlerbirliği
Turkish Cup: 2000–01

Fenerbahçe
Süper Lig: 2004–05, 2006–07

Trabzonspor
Turkish Cup: 2009–10
Turkish Super Cup: 2010

Turkey
FIFA Confederations Cup third place: 2003

References

External links
 
 
 
 

1983 births
Living people
People from Nazilli
Turkish footballers
Turkey international footballers
Turkey under-21 international footballers
2003 FIFA Confederations Cup players
Süper Lig players
Gençlerbirliği S.K. footballers
Fenerbahçe S.K. footballers
Trabzonspor footballers
Turkey youth international footballers
Association football fullbacks
Association football midfielders
Association football defenders